An Thượng may refer to several places in Vietnam:

 An Thượng, Bắc Giang, a rural commune of Yên Thế District
 , a rural commune of Hải Dương city
 An Thượng, Hanoi, a rural commune of Hoài Đức District